Alien Agent is a 2007 Canadian science fiction, action film directed by Jesse Johnson and starring Mark Dacascos, Emma Lahana with Billy Zane and Amelia Cooke.

Plot 
Rykker is an intergalactic warrior trapped on Earth, constantly fighting a gang of ruthless aliens known as The Syndicate, an alien fifth column plotting to take over the planet. The film opens with a high speed chase, with Rykker killing several syndicate agents.

Saylon is a top syndicate leader who crash-lands on Earth. His mission is to build a wormhole portal between Earth and his home planet - allowing a full-scale invasion of the Earth. Isis is the Syndicate's sexy and ruthless leader. During a series of robberies for parts to build the portal, Isis becomes determined to destroy Rykker.

Fifteen-year-old Julie's family was killed when a truck carrying materials for the portal was hijacked. Left alone in the world, she plots to avenge her family. Julie and Rykker hook up, though he tries to leave her behind for her own safety. But she keeps showing up, even saving Rykker's life one  time. They go on a cross country journey, with Isis and her army in pursuit. The final showdown inside a nuclear reactor, has Rykker and Julie battling Isis, Saylon and their army of killers in an attempt to destroy the portal and stop the invasion.

Cast 
 Mark Dacascos as Rykker
 Amelia Cooke as Isis
 Emma Lahana as Julie
 William MacDonald as Sheriff Devlin
 Kim Coates as Carl Roderick
 Billy Zane as Tom Hanson / Saylon
 Dominiquie Vandenberg as Sartek
 Annabel Kershaw as Aunt Lorry
 Jim Shield as Jack Braden
 John Tench as C.C.
 Keith Gordey as Uncle Jim
 Meghan Flather as Amber
 Sean O. Roberts as Jerry
 Darren Shahlavi as Kaylor
 Derek Hamilton as Joe
 Lindsay Maxwell as Monica

Reception 
The film was not well received by critics. Adam-Troy Castro in Sci Fi Weekly described the work as "a not-very-interesting alien invasion fought by a not-very-interesting hero and not-very-interesting heroine." Leah Holmes from SFX magazine gave it 1.5/5, saying "It's stupid and nonsensical, but at least it's funny" and George Tiller of PopMatters gave it just 1/10.

References

External links 
 
 
 

2007 films
2007 science fiction action films
2000s English-language films
English-language Canadian films
Canadian science fiction action films
Films shot in Vancouver
Films about extraterrestrial life
Alien invasions in films
Films directed by Jesse V. Johnson
2000s Canadian films